Krishnaveni is a 1974 Indian Telugu-language film directed by V. Madhusudhana Rao, starring Krishnam Raju and Vanisri, under the banner of Gopikrishna Movies. The film met with strong critical reception and commercial success upon release. The movie was about a lady suffering from hysteria and the emotional trauma of her family. The film is a remake of the Kannada hit film Sharapanjara (1971).

Plot

The movie starts with the marriage of a young couple, Krishnaveni (Vanisri) and Krishnamraju, and continues with a happy family life with kids. The couple decides to go to a tourist place called [Srisailam]. Krishnaveni has subconscious bad memories of her childhood abuse and the place where she was molested. She starts having hallucinations, overwhelming fear and other symptoms of mental illness. She is sent to a mental hospital and treated by psychologists. After her return from hospital, she is not welcomed back by her family members, kids, neighbours or even her friends. Society is afraid of her disease. Evil people misuse this opportunity. Slight disagreements or arguments are also treated as a sign of her disease. She cannot regain the affection of her husband and kids. Her misfortunes continue until she becomes ill again. The movie ends on a sad note, but conveys a message about society's misconceptions about mental illness.

Cast
 Krishnam Raju as Satyanarayana Murty
 Vanisri as Krishnaveni
 Gummadi as Krishnaveni's father
 Anjali Devi as Krishaveni's mother
 M. Balaiah
 Pandari Bai as Satyanarayana's elder sister
 Raja Babu as Bheemanna
 Rama Prabha as Kamakshi
 Nirmalamma as Sundaramna
 Manju Bhargavi as Leela

Crew
 Producers: U V Krishnam Raju
 Banner: Gopikrisha
 Music: Vijaya Bhaskar
 Lyrics: C. Narayanareddy, Arudra and Veturi
 Singers: P. Susheela and V. Ramakrishna
 Director: V. Madhusudhana Rao
 Editor: Marthand
 Story: Sharvani translated the Kannada script by Triveni.

Soundtrack
The soundtrack features 5 songs.

"Krishnaveni, Teluginti viriboni, Krishnaveni, Naa inti aliveni" - This is the most popular song in the album. It runs with two parallel themes, the hero singing about the heroine Krishnaveni and the heroine singing about the river Krishnaveni. Lyrics were written by C. Narayana Reddy. It was sung by P. Susheela and V. Ramakrishna.
"Sreesaila Mallayya" - This song praises the Lord Mallikurjana Swamy and tells the historical importance of the place Srisailam. Lyrics were written by C. Narayana Reddy. It was sung by P. Susheela.
"Sangeetam madhurasangeetam" -  This song compares the love and feelings towards children and family to music. It was sung by P. Susheela.
"Padunalegellu vanavamegi marali vacchenu Sita, Parama pavani aa maatha" - P. Susheela. This song is melancholy and runs in the backdrop of depressed situation of the heroine. It explains the afflictions and misfortunes faced by Sita, wife of the Lord Rama because of the society.
"Enduko nuvvu naato unna vela inta hayi, Enduko ninnu vidichi nimishamayina niluvalenoyi" - P. Susheela, V. Ramakrishna. T song is a romantic expression between two lovers. It depicts the happiness and peace in togetherness and the grief and pain in separation.

Awards
Filmfare Award for Best Actress - Telugu - Vanisri

References

External links
 
 Ghantasala about Krishnaveni

1974 films
Telugu remakes of Kannada films
Films based on Indian novels
Films directed by V. Madhusudhana Rao
Films produced by Krishnam Raju
Films scored by Vijaya Bhaskar
1970s Telugu-language films
Indian romantic drama films
1974 romantic drama films